Ian Ronald "Mickey" MacIntosh (June 10, 1922 – June 30, 1993) was a Canadian professional ice hockey player who played four games in the National Hockey League with the New York Rangers during the 1952–53 season. The rest of his career, which lasted from 1945 to 1957, was spent in the minor leagues.

Career statistics

Regular season and playoffs

References
 

1927 births
1993 deaths
Canadian expatriate ice hockey players in the United States
Canadian ice hockey left wingers
Cincinnati Mohawks (AHL) players
New Haven Ramblers players
New York Rangers players
New York Rovers players
St. Paul Saints (USHL) players
Sportspeople from Selkirk, Manitoba
Vancouver Canucks (WHL) players
Winnipeg Rangers players